Tansel is a Turkish name and may refer to:

 Tansel Başer (born 1978), Australian-Turkish footballer 
 Oğuz Tansel (1915-1994), Turkish poet and folklorist

Turkish-language surnames
Turkish masculine given names